Amir Moradi (born 10 April 1990, in Gandoman) is an Iranian middle-distance runner who specialises in the 800 metres. He won a bronze medal at the 2017 Asian Indoor and Martial Arts Games.

His older brother, Sajjad Moradi, was also a runner.

International competitions

1Did not finish in the final

Personal bests

Outdoor
800 metres – 1:46.55 (Jakarta 2018)
1500 metres – 3:46.89 (Ahwaz 2009)
Indoor
800 metres – 1:49.51 (Ashgabat 2017)

References

1990 births
Living people
Iranian male middle-distance runners
Asian Games silver medalists for Iran
Asian Games medalists in athletics (track and field)
Athletes (track and field) at the 2010 Asian Games
Athletes (track and field) at the 2018 Asian Games
Medalists at the 2018 Asian Games
Asian Indoor Athletics Championships winners